Waggener Hall is an academic building located on the University of Texas at Austin campus. This building houses the Classics Library on the first floor. The Classics and Philosophy Departments are based Waggener Hall, as well as the Jefferson Scholars Program.

References

University of Texas at Austin campus